Alassane is a given name or surname that is an alternative transliteration of Al-Hassan. Notable people with the name include:

 Abdou Alassane Dji Bo (born 1979), Nigerien judoka
 Alassane N'Dour (born 1981), Senegalese football player
 Alassane Ouattara (born 1942), current President of Côte d'Ivoire
 Ismaël Alassane (born 1984), Nigerien football defender

See also
 Allassani
 Lassana